Pioneer Goods Co. is a Boston-based home goods store founded in July 2014. The South End shop, owned by Justin Power, specializes in Rustic Americana décor and furniture.

History 

Owner Justin Power's involvement in the home décor industry began at a young age as he tailed along with his mother, Amy Chalmers, owner of Maison Décor, in search of unique antiques. Following in the footsteps of his mother's Reading-located interior design storefront, Power opened up a second location of Maison Décor in the South End in 2012. The shop slowly transformed from his mother's French aesthetic into a more Americana based vibe. In 2014, Power moved the location of the shop to 764 Tremont Street, where he fully launched his own rustic design appeal, Pioneer Goods Co. a separate entity of Maison Décor. Since the shop's launch in 2014, the University of Massachusetts Boston graduate's store has grown notable in the community, winning the Good & Services award for The Improper Bostonian's Boston's Best 2014.

Design Philosophy 

Power gathers inspiration for his store and products from the rustic Americana design aesthetic. Incorporating trash and old items in with newer items emphasizes Power's focus on restored antiques. Power also draws from nature—getting inspiration from Outside Magazine and photographer Ben Moon. Pioneer Goods Co.’s growing collection is outfitted with pieces from flea markets, estate sales, auctions, yard sales, Goodwill, and Salvation Army.

Partnerships

Annie Sloan Chalk Paint is used by Power to refinish and custom paint old pieces and is carried in store for sale.

Recognition & Awards 

Winner – Goods & Services. Boston's Best 2015 (The Improper Bostonian).

References

Bibliography
 
 
 
 
 
 

Interior design
South End, Boston